Jane and Finch is a neighbourhood located in the northwest end of Toronto, Ontario, Canada, in the district of North York. Centred at the intersection of Jane Street and Finch Avenue West, the area is roughly bounded by Highway 400 to the west, Black Creek to the east, Sheppard Avenue to the south, and Steeles Avenue to the north.

The Jane and Finch community is a high density and low-income neighbourhood. It is made up of single-family detached and semi-detached houses, along with several high-rise apartment buildings.

History 

Jane-Finch was originally the rural community of Elia. The area was developed as a model suburb in the 1960s in response to the rapid urban growth of Toronto. The community was planned to accommodate a socially diverse population and included a substantial amount of public housing, but insufficient thought was given to the social infrastructure needed to sustain community life.

The 1960s development plans spearheaded by the Ontario Housing Corporation (OHC) coincided with North York Planning Department’s goal of creating a more urban-looking suburb. Known for its series of high-rise buildings and, concomitantly, its above average population density, Jane-Finch experienced astronomical growth from 1961 to 1971 when the population went from 1,300 to 33,000, thereby accounting for more than 40% of the growth in North York. In general, urban planners, local politicians, residents of Jane-Finch, and others today are of the opinion that the OHC and North York erred seriously, contributing to rapid population growth in the area without anticipating its negative consequences.

By 1967, 22.5% of all residential dwellings in the Jane and Finch neighbourhood were designated public housing. Meanwhile, just 3% of North York was designated public housing at the same time. Throughout the 1960s, many of the private and public housing buildings were constructed in the modern architectural style. The high concentration of public housing units, transformed the area into a high-poverty neighbourhood.

In 1973, a group of dedicated residents, politicians and community workers started identifying ways to address community problems.  They concentrated their efforts on improving their neighbourhood’s negative image and creating a sense of community pride.  Since then the neighbourhood has developed over 30 grassroots associations, including social and health service organizations, based on principles of mutual aid. Jane-Finch residents managed to create the infra-structure that their community needed to become healthy and sustainable. They succeeded in bringing together various sectors to address a wide range of economic, social and recreational needs. Still, a 1975 study by a planning consulting firm identified the following problems resulting from the rapid growth of the community: overcrowded schools, disconnected social services, inadequate recreation facilities, and a serious issue with youth crime. They also wrote that youth felt a "general malaise…about living in the Jane-Finch area" and that the area had a "poor self-image".

The Toronto City Summit Alliance’s Strong Neighbourhoods Task Force identified the Black Creek Neighbourhood as one of the 13 Priority Neighbourhoods across the city, where there are not enough social services to address the growing needs of the community. The United Way "Strong Neighbourhoods: A Call to Action" (2001) Fact Sheet on Black Creek also reports that the Black Creek Neighbourhood, which is encompassed in the catchment region of this project, has a higher rate of racialized groups, immigrants, recent newcomers, children, youth, lone parents, low-income families, low-income unattached individuals, lower median household income, higher percentage of households with incomes below $20 000, higher proportion of rental households, higher unemployment, lower percentage of population with university education, and higher percentage of population with less than high school education.

In 1983 Jennifer Hodge de Silva, a pioneering filmmaker of the 1970s and 1980s produced the film, Home Feeling: Struggle for a Community which revealed tensions between police and area residents.

Between 1981 and 2001, the total population of North York grew by 8.7%; higher economic families by 9%, but poor economic families by 80.5%. Poverty intensified in 5 main areas. The most prominent is the Jane-Finch area, where four poor neighbourhoods turned into regions of very high poverty, and a region that previously had low to moderate poverty became classified as having high levels of poverty. By 2001, a major shift had taken place, with the immigrant family population now accounting for 62.4% of the total family population in these communities, and Canadian born families making up the remaining 37.6%. Between 1981 and 2001, the number of racialized individuals also increased by 219%. The Toronto City Summit Alliance’s Strong Neighbourhoods Task Force identified the Black Creek Neighbourhood as one of the 13 Priority Neighbourhoods across the city, where there are not enough social services to address the growing needs of the community.

As part of a rebranding strategy in 2008, Toronto City Councillor Anthony Perruzza had banners attached to hundreds of hydro poles in Jane and Finch, calling the area University Heights, referencing the existing name of the neighbourhood in municipal planning documents.

21st century (2001–present)
By 2002, the area had "one of the highest proportions of youth, sole-supported families, refugees and immigrants, low-income earners and public housing tenants of any community in Toronto". That year, only 70% of people in the neighbourhood had proper indoor plumbing (compared to 95% of Canadians), and brownouts were common. Over half of the neighbourhood's residents lived below the poverty line.  The United Way’s “Poverty by Postal Code-The Geography of Neighbourhood Poverty: 1981–2001” (2004) report explained that by 2001, there were more high-poverty neighbourhoods in the former City of North York than in any of the other former cities.

Several community-based organizations, businesses, community residents and city staff have joined together to form the Black Creek West Community Capacity Building Project. Funded by the City of Toronto, the project aims to "improve the quality of life for residents living in the Black Creek West community by placing emphasis on building on assets and capacities, prevention, community involvement, diversity and community well-being."  There are also a number of other organizations and networks that have come together to develop programs and solutions to the problems that have been identified in the various reports.

Culture

Being one of the most visible minority-concentrated communities in the City of Toronto, the Jane-Finch community hosts a number of cultural activities.

International Women's Day – The Jane-Finch community is an active participant in International Women's Day.  For example, in 2004, Driftwood Community Centre hosted the event for the community, the theme of which was "Balancing Family and Work."  Several community organizations sponsored the event, such as Doorsteps Neighbourhood Services, Delta Family Resource Centre, Driftwood Community Centre and the Jane/Finch Community & Family Centre.  Other participating agencies included Hincks-Dellcrest Centre, Costi and the North York Women's Centre.  Activities of the day included a "Women & Work" resource table, parenting seminars, child care and poetry readings from award-winning poet Lillian Allen.  Women were also treated to manicures, hair-braiding and yoga.
The Black Creek Community Health Centre also participates in the planning and organizing of International Women's Day, through a Planning Group that hosts a series of community-based planning workshops.  The International Women's Day conference provides the opportunity for women in the community to build relationships, develop a coalition across differences and gain skills related to civic participation.

International Day for the Elimination of Racial Discrimination – The Jane-Finch community gets involved in the ‘’International Day for the Elimination of Racial Discrimination."  In 1999, MuchMusic hosted a Stop Racism Video Competition, accepting 320 entries nationwide.  One of the top ten winners included Paul Nguyen, a Jane-Finch community member and creator of Jane-Finch.com, and his team members Helen Vong and Chris Williams.  At the awards show on March 3, 1999, the team was awarded various prizes by Dr. Hedy Fry, Minister of Multiculturalism.

Toronto Caribbean Carnival Parade Kids’ Carnival – A part of Toronto's celebrated annual ‘’Caribbean Carnival Parade" (Caribana) is the Junior Parade for children ages 4–16.  This "Kiddie's Carnival" parade and Caribbean marketplace are held in the heart of the Jane-Finch community and are open to the public.  Children spend the day proudly showing off their colourful costumes, dancing to festive music, competing for prizes and crowns, and celebrating a sense of pride in their culture and community.

Canadian Hispanic Day Parade – Run by a non-profit organization that aims to promote the cultural heritage of the Latin American people of Canada, the Canadian Hispanic Day Parade is an annual event held in the Jane-Finch community.  In 2006, the 6th annual parade was held on August 26 and 27, beginning at the Jane and Sheppard Mall and ending at the John Booth Arena (Jane and Shoreham).  The parade gives the Latin community an opportunity to come together, celebrate a sense of belonging and share Latin culture and heritage with others.  It is the only such parade in Canada.

Members of the Hispanic Day Parade/Super Latin World Arts Festival Inc. organizing committee(s) also work to support Jane-Finch youth by raising funds through various fundraising activities.  These funds aim to increase youth accessibility to bursaries provided by the Toronto Board of Education and 31 Division, which are offered to 10 students in the Jane Finch community who have been identified as community leaders by the Board of Education.  These youth must be pursuing post-secondary education and must be paying a portion of their tuition independently from the bursary.  Recognizing that this is not possible for some community youth, members of Hispanic Day Parade/Super Latin World Arts Festival organizing committee(s) raise funds that are held in trust by the Jane-Finch Community and Family Centre and disbursed to selected youth within the community.

Demographics

Two city neighbourhoods cover the area commonly known as Jane and Finch. From Finch north to Steeles is considered part of the Black Creek community while from Finch south to Sheppard is called Glenfield-Jane Heights.

The population of Jane and Finch has generally been in decline since the 1996 census.

North Jane & Finch (Black Creek)
As of 2016, the northern half of the neighbourhood had a population of 21,737.

Major ethnic populations (2016):
 29.0% Black;  9.6% Jamaican
 19.0% European;  7.2% Italian
 11.9% Southeast Asian;  10.6% Vietnamese
 11.7% South Asian;  6.9% East Indian
 8.2% Latin American (of any race)

South Jane & Finch (Glenfield-Jane Heights)
As of 2016, the southern half of the neighbourhood had a population of 30,491.

Major ethnic populations (2016):
 24.2% Black;  10.0% Jamaican
 23.2% European;  14.1% Italian
 12.0% Latin American (of any race)
 13.0% Southeast Asian;  11.7% Vietnamese
 7.4% Chinese
 7.0% South Asian;  6.5% East Indian

Education

Two public school boards operate schools in Jane and Finch, the separate Toronto Catholic District School Board (TCDSB), and the secular Toronto District School Board (TDSB). Before 1998, they were overseen by the Metropolitan Separate School Board (MSSB) and North York Board of Education (NYBE) respectively. Both TCDSB, and TDSB operate public primary education institutions in the neighbourhood, including:

 Blacksmith Public School (TDSB)
 Blessed Margherita of Cittá di Castello School (TCDSB)
 Brookview Middle School (TDSB)
 Driftwood Public School (TDSB)
 Firgrove Public School (TDSB)
 Oakdale Park Middle School (TDSB)
 Shoreham Public Sports and Wellness Academy (formerly known as Shoreham Public School) (TDSB)
 St. Charles Garnier Catholic School (TCDSB)
 St. Francis De Sales Catholic School (TCDSB)
 St. Jane Frances Catholic School (TCDSB)
 Stanley Public School (TDSB)
 Topcliff Public School (TDSB)
 Yorkwoods Public School (TDSB)

In addition to public primary education institutions, TDSB also operate two public secondary schools, Westview Centennial Secondary School and C. W. Jefferys Collegiate Institute.

However, the board previously operated Regina Pacis Catholic Secondary School, opened in 1980 until its closure in 2002. The building has been occupied by Monsignor Fraser College's Norfinch Campus is also situated in the neighbourhood. Monsignor Fraser College is a secondary education institution operated by TCDSB as a specialized dual-track alternative and adult secondary school.

The French first language public secular school board, Conseil scolaire Viamonde, and it separate counterpart, Conseil scolaire catholique MonAvenir also offer schooling to applicable residents of Jane and Finch, although they do not operate a school in the neighbourhood. CSCM and CSV students attend schools situated in other neighbourhoods in Toronto.

Recreation

Several municipal parks are situated in Jane and Finch, including Fennimore Park, Driftwood Park, Edgeley Park, Hullmar Park, Oakdale Park, Remberto Navia Sports Field, Silvio Colella Park, and Topcliff Park. Several municipal parks are situated near the Black Creek, a tributary of the Humber River. The Black Creek, and its valleys, forms a part of the larger Toronto ravine system. Municipal parks in Jane and Finch are maintained by the Toronto Parks, Forestry and Recreation Division. The division also operates several community centres in the neighbourhood, including Driftwood Community Centre, Domenico DiLuca Community Recreation Centre, Northwood Community Centre, Oakdale Community Centre.

Two branches of the Toronto Public Library also operate from the neighbourhood, York Woods branch, and Jane/Sheppard branch.

Black Creek Pioneer Village, located in the northeast of the neighbourhood next to Black Creek, is an open-air museum of 19th-century Ontario life.

Transportation
Several major roadways bound the neighbourhood, including the two namesake streets that form its core; Jane Street and Finch Avenue. Other major thoroughfares that pass through the neighbourhood are Steeles Avenue to the north, Sheppard Avenue to the south, and Highway 400 to the west. Highway 400 is a controlled access highway that forms a part of the province's 400-series highways.

Public transportation in the neighbourhood is provided by the Toronto Transit Commission (TTC). The TTC operates several bus routes in the neighbourhood. Finch West station, on the western branch of Line 1 of the Toronto subway, is located at Keele Street, 2 km east of the Jane-Finch intersection, and is accessed via the 36 Finch West bus.

Construction of a light rail line through the neighbourhood, the Finch West LRT, is presently underway with the line expected to open in 2023. In conjunction with the Finch West LRT, construction of a new community hub is planned to be built in the Jane and Finch area.

Notable people 
Chuckie Akenz, hip hop musician
Anthony Bennett, top overall pick in the 2013 NBA draft by the Cleveland Cavaliers
Jully Black, R&B musician
Denham Brown, professional basketball player
Junior Cadougan, professional basketball player
Dream Warriors, hip hop group
Dwight Drummond, broadcaster
Olu Famutimi, professional basketball player
Louis Ferreira, actor
Melanie Fiona, R&B musician
Glenn Lewis, R&B musician
Michie Mee, hip hop musician
Carlos Newton, former UFC Welterweight Champion
Pressa, rap musician
Paul Nguyen, community activist
Jessie Reyez, R&B/pop musician
Cabral "Cabbie" Richards, TV personality
Mark Simms, community activist
Nora Fatehi, Bollywood actress/International Star

References

Black Canadian culture in Toronto
Black Canadian settlements
Neighbourhoods in Toronto
North York
Poverty in Canada
Urban decay in Canada